Coppley may refer to:

Coppley Apparel Group, Canadian manufacturer of menswear line of suits, sport coats and trousers based in Hamilton, Ontario 
George Charles Coppley (1858–1936), mayor of Hamilton, Ontario, Canada from 1921 to 1922